The dusky-throated hermit (Phaethornis squalidus) is a species of hummingbird in the family Trochilidae. It is endemic to Brazil.

Taxonomy and systematics

The dusky-throated hermit has sometimes included what is now (2021) the streak-throated hermit (P. rupurumii) but it is now treated as monotypic.

Description

It is a medium-sized hermit hummingbird. It is generally brownish with a greenish back and ochraceous underparts. It has a black "mask" and white supercilium and malar stripe and a dark brown throat. The sexes are generally alike, though the female may have paler underparts and a slightly more decurved bill.

Distribution and habitat

The dusky-throated hermit is found in southeastern Brazil, mostly from southern Minas Gerais and Espírito Santo south to Santa Catarina, and also in the Iguazu Falls area of western Paraná.

Behavior

Movement

The dusky-throated hermit is believed to be sedentary.

Feeding

The dusky-throated hermit feeds on nectar and also on small arthropods, but details of its diet and foraging technique have not been published.

Breeding

The dusky-throated hermit's breeding season spans from October to February. Its nest is a cone-shaped cup suspended from the underside of a drooping leaf. The clutch size is two eggs and the female alone incubates them.

Vocalization

The dusky-throated hermit's song is "a complex warbling high-pitched phrase repeated continuously...e.g. 'tsi-teeé-tsa-tsa-tseé-CHAW-CHAW'." Its call is "a high-pitched 'tsee!'."

Status

The IUCN has assessed the dusky-throated hermit as being of Least Concern, though its population size and trend are unknown. "Continuing destruction of rainforest may present a major threat in [the] future."

References

dusky-throated hermit
Birds of the Atlantic Forest
Endemic birds of Brazil
Hummingbird species of South America
dusky-throated hermit
Taxonomy articles created by Polbot